RTM TV2 (stylised as tv2) is a Malaysian free-to-air television channel owned and operated by the Radio Televisyen Malaysia, a broadcasting department of the Malaysian Government. Launched on 17 November 1969, TV2 is the second and second oldest TV station in Malaysia. The channel features mostly English, Mandarin and Tamil news and talk shows, the latter two languages were mainly produced for Chinese and Indian communities. It also offers some in-house, local and international entertainment programs, including reality shows, films and dramas as well as sports programming.

History 

TV2, then Rangkaian Kedua (Second Network) began operations on 17 November 1969, when Televisyen Malaysia (currently known as TV1) bifurcated into two channels and merge with Radio Malaysia to become the present-day broadcasting department. Then, TV1 was known as Rangkaian Pertama (First Network).

Like TV1, TV2 started broadcasting in colour since 28 December 1978 in Peninsular Malaysia and 31 August 1980 in Sabah and Sarawak just in time for Independence Day. During its early years, it only broadcast in the evenings, with daytime broadcasts for schools under the TV Pendidikan banner from 1972 until 1999 when daytime transmission was introduced on the channel.

Since 3 April 2006, the channel began to broadcast 24 hours a day to offer more programmes for viewers who stay up late to watch television. Its sister channel, TV1 followed suit more than 6 years later on 21 August 2012. On 1 April 2019, TV2 has started its HDTV broadcasting in conjunction of RTM's 73rd anniversary, and available exclusively through myFreeview DTT service on channel 102.

See also
 List of Malaysian television stations
 Radio Televisyen Malaysia
 TV1
 TV Okey
 Sukan RTM
 Berita RTM

References

External links
 

1969 establishments in Malaysia
Television stations in Malaysia
Television channels and stations established in 1969
Radio Televisyen Malaysia